Anton Gorchev was a Bulgarian stage and film actor born in 1939, deceased in 2000.

Gorchev is best known for his performance as Karaivan in the Bulgarian film classic The Goat Horn (1972), for which he received broad critical acclaim. He is also known for his roles in the films Thorn Apple (1972), Ivan Kondarev  (1974), Village Correspondent (1974), The Weddings of King Ioan Assen (1975),  White Magic (1982) as well as his numerous notable appearances on the stage.

Biography and career
Born Anton Zafirov Gorchev on November 10, 1939, in the city of Sofia, he enrolled acting at The National Academy for Theatre and Film Arts where he graduated in 1963. After the graduation, Gorchev was appointed in the Varna Theatre for two years. In 1965, he went to Plovdiv and started working with the local municipal theatre. Here Gorchev met his wife Sonya Markova. He returned to Sofia in 1971 and became a regular actor in the Boyana film studios. In 1973, Gorchev joined the troupe of the Sofia municipal theatre.

Partial filmography

References

Sources

External links
 

Bulgarian male film actors
Bulgarian male stage actors
Bulgarian male television actors
1939 births
2000 deaths
Male actors from Sofia
20th-century Bulgarian male actors
People from Sofia
National Academy for Theatre and Film Arts alumni